Oviedo is a city in Spain.

Oviedo may also refer to:

People
 Bryan Oviedo (born 1990), Costa Rican association football player
 Ernesto Oviedo Oviedo (born 1953), Mexican politician 
 Frankie Oviedo (born 1973), Colombian footballer and coach 
 Gonzalo Fernández de Oviedo y Valdés (1478–1557), Castilian writer and historian
 Johan Oviedo (born 1998), Cuban baseball player
 Juan Carlos Oviedo (born 1982), Dominican Republican baseball player (AKA Leo Núñez)
 Lino Oviedo (born 1943), Paraguayan politician
 Lucas Oviedo (born 1985), Argentine association football player
 Luis Oviedo (born 1999), Venezuelan baseball player
 Luis Oviedo (volleyball) (born 1957), Cuban volleyball player
 Nahuel Oviedo (born 1990), Argentine footballer 
 Papi Oviedo (1938–2017), Cuban musician

Other uses
 Oviedo (comarca), a region in Spain
 Oviedo, Dominican Republic, a city in the Dominican Republic
 Oviedo, Florida, a city in the United States
 Sudarium of Oviedo ("Shroud of Oviedo"), a religious relic kept in the Spanish city